Sarah Bonikowsky (born August 23, 1982) is a Canadian rower. She was born in Orangeville, Ontario and graduated from the University of Victoria with a Bachelor of Arts, majoring in philosophy with a minor in Greek and Roman studies.

She finished in fourth place at the 2008 Summer Olympic Games in Beijing, China in the women's eights with Ashley Brzozowicz, Darcy Marquardt, Buffy-Lynne Williams, Jane Thornton, Romina Stefancic, Andréanne Morin, Heather Mandoli and cox Lesley Thompson-Willie.

References

 Profile at Rowing Canada

1982 births
Rowers from Ontario
Canadian female rowers
Living people
Olympic rowers of Canada
People from Orangeville, Ontario
Rowers at the 2008 Summer Olympics
Rowers at the 2011 Pan American Games
University of Victoria alumni
Pan American Games bronze medalists for Canada
Pan American Games medalists in rowing
Medalists at the 2011 Pan American Games
21st-century Canadian women